Inny-Christian Radebe  (born 3 January 1995) is a South African rugby union player for the  in the Currie Cup and the  in the Rugby Challenge. He can play as a fly-half, inside centre or fullback.

Rugby career

Schoolboy rugby

He also earned selection during high school level, representing the Golden Lions at the 2011 Under-16 Grant Khomo Week and at the Under-18 Craven Week in both 2012 and 2013.

Sharks / UKZN

Radebe signed a deal to join the Durban-based  academy after finishing high school. He made one appearance for the s in 2013 in a 38–0 victory against  prior to joining them on a full-time basis. In 2014, he started eleven of the team's matches in the 2014 Under-19 Provincial Championship and scored 122 points, second only to Western Province's Ernst Stapelberg in the top scorers list in Group A of the competition. He scored four tries – three in their two matches against former side Golden Lions and a fourth against Eastern Province, to help the side progress to the semi-finals, where they lost 20–43 to the Blue Bulls.

Radebe made four appearances for  during the 2015 Varsity Shield, scoring 44 points on the way, and picked up a "Player That Rocks" award in the finals, where he helped UKZN to silverware by beating  29–24. Radebe was initially included in Coach Dawie Theron's squad to contest the Junior World Cup in Italy before withdrawing through injury

Radebe next played for the  side in their 2015 Under-21 Provincial Championship Group A season. He made ten starts during the competition, scoring six tries and 105 points with the boot to finish as the top scorer in the competition with a tally of 135 points.

He returned at the start of July to make further appearances in the Currie Cup competition.

Notes

References

South African rugby union players
Living people
1995 births
Rugby union players from Johannesburg
Rugby union fly-halves
Rugby union centres
Rugby union fullbacks
Sharks (Currie Cup) players
Sharks (rugby union) players
Golden Lions players
Eastern Province Elephants players